The 2014–15 Sacramento Kings season is the 70th season of the franchise, and the 66th season in the National Basketball Association (NBA), and its 30th in Sacramento.
The Kings finished 29-53, improving by one win with a defeat of the Los Angeles Lakers on the final day of the regular season.

Preseason

Draft picks

Regular season

Standings

Game log

|- style="background:#fcc;"
| 1
| October 29
| Golden State
| 
| DeMarcus Cousins (20)
| DeMarcus Cousins (11)
| Darren Collison (8)
| Sleep Train Arena17,317
| 0–1
|- style="background:#cfc;"
| 2
| October 31
| Portland
| 
| Rudy Gay (40)
| DeMarcus Cousins (9)
| Darren Collison (8)
| Sleep Train Arena14,648
| 1–1

|- style="background:#cfc;"
| 3
| November 2
| @ L.A. Clippers
| 
| DeMarcus Cousins (34)
| DeMarcus Cousins (17)
| Rudy Gay (6)
| Staples Center19,060
| 2–1
|- style="background:#cfc;"
| 4
| November 3
| @ Denver
| 
| Darren Collison (21)
| Reggie Evans (14)
| Darren Collison (6)
| Pepsi Center12,516
| 3–1
|- style="background:#cfc;"
| 5
| November 5
| Denver
| 
| DeMarcus Cousins (30)
| DeMarcus Cousins (11)
| Darren Collison (8)
| Sleep Train Arena14,539
| 4–1
|- style="background:#cfc;"
| 6
| November 7
| @ Phoenix
| 
| DeMarcus Cousins (25)
| DeMarcus Cousins (18)
| Ramon Sessions (4)
| US Airways Center15,476
| 5–1
|- style="background:#fcc;"
| 7
| November 9
| @ Oklahoma City
| 
| Rudy Gay (23)
| Rudy Gay (10)
| Darren Collison (7)
| Chesapeake Energy Arena18,203
| 5–2
|- style="background:#fcc;"
| 8
| November 11
| @ Dallas
| 
| Rudy Gay (26)
| DeMarcus Cousins (11)
| Rudy Gay (8)
| American Airlines Center19,663
| 5–3
|- style="background:#fcc;"
| 9
| November 13
| @ Memphis
| 
| Rudy Gay (25)
| DeMarcus Cousins (12)
| Darren Collison (5)
| FedExForum15,666
| 5–4
|- style="background:#cfc;"
| 10
| November 15
| San Antonio
| 
| DeMarcus Cousins (25)
| DeMarcus Cousins (10)
| Rudy Gay (6)
| Sleep Train Arena17,317
| 6–4
|- style="background:#fcc;"
| 11
| November 18
| New Orleans
| 
| DeMarcus Cousins (24)
| DeMarcus Cousins (17)
| Darren Collison (11)
| Sleep Train Arena16,526
| 6–5
|- style="background:#cfc;"
| 12
| November 20
| Chicago
| 
| DeMarcus Cousins (22)
| DeMarcus Cousins (14)
| Darren Collison (12)
| Sleep Train Arena17,317
| 7–5
|- style="background:#cfc;"
| 13
| November 22
| @ Minnesota
| 
| DeMarcus Cousins (31)
| DeMarcus Cousins (18)
| Darren Collison (7)
| Target Center13,191
| 8–5
|- style="background:#cfc;"
| 14
| November 25
| @ New Orleans
| 
| Casspi & Cousins (22)
| DeMarcus Cousins (12)
| Ramon Sessions (6)
| Smoothie King Center17,037
| 9–5
|- style="background:#fcc;"
| 15
| November 26
| @ Houston
| 
| DeMarcus Cousins (29)
| DeMarcus Cousins (17)
| DeMarcus Cousins (6)
| Toyota Center18,058
| 9–6
|- style="background:#fcc;"
| 16
| November 28
| @ San Antonio
| 
| Rudy Gay (23)
| Jason Thompson (9)
| Rudy Gay (8)
| AT&T Center18,581
| 9–7
|- style="background:#fcc;"
| 17
| November 30
| Memphis
| 
| Rudy Gay (20)
| Reggie Evans (20)
| Darren Collison (7)
| Sleep Train Arena16,240
| 9–8

|- style="background:#fcc;"
| 18
| December 2
| Toronto
| 
| Ben McLemore (21)
| Reggie Evans (7)
| Rudy Gay (10)
| Sleep Train Arena15,522
| 9–9
|- style="background:#cfc;"
| 19
| December 5
| Indiana
| 
| Rudy Gay (27)
| Jason Thompson (10)
| Darren Collison (6)
| Sleep Train Arena15,512
| 10–9
|- style="background:#fcc;"
| 20
| December 6
| Orlando
| 
| Darren Collison (22)
| Jason Thompson (9)
| Ramon Sessions (7)
| Sleep Train Arena16,021
| 10–10
|- style="background:#cfc;"
| 21
| December 8
| Utah
| 
| Rudy Gay (29)
| Reggie Evans (13)
| Darren Collison (6)
| Sleep Train Arena16,511
| 11–10
|- style="background:#fcc;"
| 22
| December 9
| @ L. A. Lakers
| 
| Darren Collison (29)
| Reggie Evans (13)
| Darren Collison (6)
| Staples Center18,267
| 11–11
|- style="background:#fcc;"
| 23
| December 11
| Houston
| 
| Darren Collison (24)
| Jason Thompson (15)
| Rudy Gay (8)
| Sleep Train Arena16,676
| 11–12
|- style="background:#fcc;"
| 24
| December 13
| Detroit
| 
| Rudy Gay (20)
| Carl Landry (11)
| Rudy Gay (8)
| Sleep Train Arena16,242
| 11–13
|- style="background:#fcc;"
| 25
| December 16
| Oklahoma City
| 
| Rudy Gay (22)
| Thompson & Hollins (9)
| Ramon Sessions (4)
| Sleep Train Arena17,317
| 11–14
|- style="background:#fcc;"
| 26
| December 18
| Milwaukee
| 
| DeMarcus Cousins (27)
| DeMarcus Cousins (11)
| Rudy Gay (6)
| Sleep Train Arena17,317
| 11–15
|- style="background:#cfc;"
| 27
| December 21
| L.A. Lakers
| 
| DeMarcus Cousins (29)
| DeMarcus Cousins (14)
| Rudy Gay (6)
| Sleep Train Arena17,317
| 12–15
|- style="background:#fcc;"
| 28
| December 22
| @ Golden State
| 
| DeMarcus Cousins (22)
| Rudy Gay (9)
| Ray McCallum, Jr. (7)
| Oracle Arena19,596
| 12–16
|- style="background:#fcc;"
| 29
| December 26
| Phoenix
| 
| Darren Collison (19)
| Reggie Evans (16)
| Gay & McCallum, Jr. (5)
| Sleep Train Arena17,317
| 12–17
|- style="background:#cfc;"
| 30
| December 27
| New York
| 
| DeMarcus Cousins (39)
| DeMarcus Cousins (11)
| Darren Collison (10)
| Sleep Train Arena17,317
| 13–17
|- style="background:#fcc;"
| 31
| December 29
| @ Brooklyn
| 
| Rudy Gay (25)
| DeMarcus Cousins (13)
| Darren Collison (8)
| Barclays Center17,732
| 13–18
|- style="background:#fcc;"
| 32
| December 31
| @ Boston
| 
| Rudy Gay (25)
| DeMarcus Cousins (13)
| Darren Collison (8)
| TD Garden18,624
| 13–19

|- style="background:#cfc;"
| 33
| January 1
| @ Minnesota
| 
| Gay & Collison (21)
| Carl Landry (9)
| Darren Collison (6)
| Target Center12,254
| 14–19
|- style="background:#fcc;"
| 34
| January 4
| @ Detroit
| 
| DeMarcus Cousins (18)
| DeMarcus Cousins (15)
| Cousins & McLemore (4)
| The Palace of Auburn Hills13,337
| 14–20
|- style="background:#cfc;"
| 35
| January 7
| Oklahoma City
| 
| Rudy Gay (28)
| DeMarcus Cousins (15)
| Darren Collison (7)
| Sleep Train Arena16,037
| 15–20
|- style="background:#fcc;"
| 36
| January 9
| Denver
| 
| DeMarcus Cousins (32)
| DeMarcus Cousins (13)
| Darren Collison (7)
| Sleep Train Arena16,029
| 15–21
|- style="background:#cfc;"
| 37
| January 11
| Cleveland
| 
| DeMarcus Cousins (32)
| DeMarcus Cousins (13)
| Darren Collison (7)
| Sleep Train Arena16,143
| 16–21
|- style="background:#fcc;"
| 38
| January 13
| Dallas
| 
| DeMarcus Cousins (32)
| DeMarcus Cousins (16)
| DeMarcus Cousins (9)
| Sleep Train Arena15,747
| 16–22
|- style="background:#fcc;"
| 39
| January 16
| Miami
| 
| DeMarcus Cousins (17)
| DeMarcus Cousins (11)
| Darren Collison (6)
| Sleep Train Arena16,350
| 16–23
|- style="background:#fcc;"
| 40
| January 17
| L.A. Clippers
| 
| Jason Thompson (23)
| Jason Thompson (22)
| Darren Collison (4)
| Sleep Train Arena16,601
| 16–24
|- style="background:#fcc;"
| 41
| January 19
| @ Portland
| 
| DeMarcus Cousins (22)
| DeMarcus Cousins (19)
| Darren Collison (8)
| Moda Center19,441
| 16–25
|- style="background:#fcc;"
| 42
| January 21
| Brooklyn
| 
| DeMarcus Cousins (22)
| DeMarcus Cousins (19)
| Darren Collison (8)
| Sleep Train Arena16,427
| 16–26
|- style="background:#fcc;"
| 43
| January 23
| @ Golden State
| 
| DeMarcus Cousins (28)
| DeMarcus Cousins (11)
| Collison & Gay (8)
| Oracle Arena19,596
| 16–27
|- style="background:#fcc;"
| 44
| January 28
| @ Toronto
| 
| Rudy Gay (28)
| Carl Landry (7)
| DeMarcus Cousins (4)
| Air Canada Centre19,800
| 16–28
|- style="background:#fcc;"
| 45
| January 30
| @ Cleveland
| 
| DeMarcus Cousins (21)
| DeMarcus Cousins (13)
| Cousins & Collison (4)
| Quicken Loans Arena20,562
| 16–29
|- style="background:#cfc;"
| 46
| January 31
| @ Indiana
| 
| Rudy Gay (31)
| DeMarcus Cousins (19)
| Darren Collison (5)
| Bankers Life Fieldhouse18,165
| 17–29

|- style="background:#fcc;"
| 47
| February 3
| Golden State
| 
| DeMarcus Cousins (26)
| DeMarcus Cousins (11)
| Darren Collison (7)
| Sleep Train Arena17,317
| 17–30
|- style="background:#fcc;"
| 48
| February 5
| Dallas
| 
| DeMarcus Cousins (23)
| DeMarcus Cousins (11)
| Rudy Gay (4)
| Sleep Train Arena16,993
| 17–31
|- style="background:#fcc;"
| 49
| February 7
| @ Utah
| 
| DeMarcus Cousins (27)
| Reggie Evans (11)
| Ramon Sessions (5)
| EnergySolutions Arena19,128
| 17–32
|- style="background:#cfc;"
| 50
| February 8
| Phoenix
| 
| DeMarcus Cousins (28)
| DeMarcus Cousins (12)
| Ramon Sessions (6)
| Sleep Train Arena17,013
| 18–32
|- style="background:#fcc;"
| 51
| February 10
| @ Chicago
| 
| Rudy Gay (24)
| DeMarcus Cousins (8)
| DeMarcus Cousins (8)
| United Center21,560
| 18–33
|- style="background:#fcc;"
| 52
| February 11
| @ Milwaukee
| 
| DeMarcus Cousins (28)
| DeMarcus Cousins (19)
| Ramon Sessions (6)
| BMO Harris Bradley Center13,046
| 18–34
|- align="center"
|colspan="9" bgcolor="#bbcaff"|All-Star Break
|- style="background:#cfc;"
| 53
| February 20
| Boston
| 
| DeMarcus Cousins (32)
| DeMarcus Cousins (15)
| Omri Casspi (6)
| Sleep Train Arena17,317
| 19–34
|- style="background:#fcc;"
| 54
| February 21
| @ L.A. Clippers
| 
| DeMarcus Cousins (21)
| Omri Casspi (17)
| Ray McCallum, Jr. (5)
| Staples Center19,133
| 19–35
|- style="background:#cfc;"
| 55
| February 25
| Memphis
| 
| Rudy Gay (28)
| Thompson & Evans (11)
| Andre Miller (7)
| Sleep Train Arena16,794
| 20–35
|- style="background:#fcc;"
| 56
| February 27
| San Antonio
| 
| Ben McLemore (21)
| Thompson & Evans (11)
| Rudy Gay (4)
| Sleep Train Arena17,317
| 20–36

|- style="background:#fcc;"
| 57
| March 1
| Portland
| 
| Rudy Gay (24)
| Rudy Gay (8)
| Andre Miller (10)
| Sleep Train Arena16,776
| 20–37
|- style="background:#cfc;"
| 58
| March 3
| @ New York
| 
| Rudy Gay (25)
| DeMarcus Cousins (10)
| Gay & McCallum, Jr. & McLemore (4)
| Madison Square Garden19,812
| 21–37
|- style="background:#fcc;"
| 59
| March 4
| @ San Antonio
| 
| DeMarcus Cousins (10)
| McCallum, Jr. & Thompson (7)
| McCallum, Jr. & Miller (4)
| AT&T Center18,581
| 21–38
|- style="background:#fcc;"
| 60
| March 6
| @ Orlando
| 
| Rudy Gay (39)
| DeMarcus Cousins (12) 
| Andre Miller (8)
| Amway Center15,112
| 21–39
|- style="background:#fcc;"
| 61
| March 7
| @ Miami
|
| Gay & Cousins (27)
| DeMarcus Cousins (12) 
| Andre Miller (8)
| AmericanAirlines Arena19,600
| 21–40
|- style="background:#fcc;"
| 62
| March 9
| @ Atlanta
| 
| Rudy Gay (23)
| DeMarcus Cousins (14)
| DeMarcus Cousins (6)
| Philips Arena18,418
| 21–41
|- style="background:#cfc;"
| 63
| March 11
| @ Charlotte
| 
| Ben McLemore (27)
| DeMarcus Cousins (14)
| Ray McCallum, Jr. (9)
| Time Warner Cable Arena15,885
| 22–41
|- style="background:#fcc;"
| 64
| March 13
| @ Philadelphia
| 
| DeMarcus Cousins (39)
| DeMarcus Cousins (24)
| Ray McCallum, Jr. (9)
| Wells Fargo Center12,331
| 22–42
|- style="background:#fcc;"
| 65
| March 14
| @ Washington
| 
| DeMarcus Cousins (30)
| Cousins & McCallum, Jr. & Evans (6)
| Andre Miller (7)
| Verizon Center20,356
| 22–43
|- style="background:#fcc;"
| 66
| March 16
| Atlanta
| 
| DeMarcus Cousins (20)
| DeMarcus Cousins (13)
| Andre Miller (7)
| Sleep Train Arena16,835
| 22–44
|- style="background:#fcc;"
| 67
| March 18
| L.A. Clippers
| 
| Rudy Gay (23)
| Reggie Evans (11)
| Gay & Miller (4)
| Sleep Train Arena16,785
| 22–45
|- style="background:#cfc;"
| 68
| March 20
| Charlotte
| 
| Rudy Gay (33)
| Reggie Evans (16)
| Andre Miller (7)
| Sleep Train Arena16,799
| 23–45
|- style="background:#cfc;"
| 69
| March 22
| Washington
| 
| Rudy Gay (26)
| DeMarcus Cousins (7)
| McCallum, Jr. (6)
| Sleep Train Arena17,008
| 24–45
|- style="background:#cfc;"
| 70
| March 24
| Philadelphia
| 
| DeMarcus Cousins (33)
| DeMarcus Cousins (17)
| Andre Miller (6)
| Sleep Train Arena16,636
| 25–45
|- style="background:#cfc;"
| 71
| March 25
| @ Phoenix
| 
| DeMarcus Cousins (24)
| DeMarcus Cousins (11)
| Andre Miller (7)
| US Airways Center17,589
| 26–45
|- style="background:#fcc;"
| 72
| March 27
| @ New Orleans
| 
| DeMarcus Cousins (39)
| DeMarcus Cousins (20)
| McCallum, Jr. (5)
| Smoothie King Center17,669
| 26–46
|- style="background:#fcc;"
| 73
| March 30
| @ Memphis
| 
| Rudy Gay (24)
| Reggie Evans (7)
| McCallum, Jr. & Stauskas (3)
| FedExForum17,218
| 26–47

|- style="background:#fcc;"
| 74
| April 1
| @ Houston
| 
| DeMarcus Cousins (24)
| DeMarcus Cousins (21) 
| DeMarcus Cousins (10)
| Toyota Center18,312
| 26–48
|- style="background:#fcc;"
| 75
| April 3
| New Orleans
| 
| DeMarcus Cousins (24)
| DeMarcus Cousins (20) 
| DeMarcus Cousins (13) 
| Sleep Train Arena17,021
| 26–49
|- style="background:#fcc;"
| 76
| April 5
| Utah
| 
| DeMarcus Cousins (26)
| DeMarcus Cousins (12) 
| Ray McCallum, Jr. (7)
| Sleep Train Arena16,716
| 26–50
|- style="background:#cfc;"
| 77
| April 7
| Minnesota
| 
| Rudy Gay (32)
| Ray McCallum, Jr. (9)
| Andre Miller (8)
| Sleep Train Arena16,770
| 27–50
|- style="background:#fcc;"
| 78
| April 8
| @ Utah
| 
| Casspi & Landry & McLemore (16)
| Jason Thompson (11)
| Omri Casspi (5)
| EnergySolutions Arena18,351
| 27–51
|- style="background:#fcc;"
| 79
| April 10
| @ Oklahoma City
| 
| Ben McLemore (20)
| Jason Thompson (14)
| Andre Miller (8)
| Chesapeake Energy Arena18,203
| 27–52
|- style="background:#fcc;"
| 80
| April 12
| @ Denver
| 
| Omri Casspi (22)
| Omri Casspi (7)
| Casspi & McLemore (7)
| Pepsi Center14,004
| 27–53
|- style="background:#cfc;"
| 81
| April 13
| L.A. Lakers
| 
| Omri Casspi (26)
| Jason Thompson (10)
| Casspi & Miller (6)
| Sleep Train Arena17,317
| 28–53
|- style="background:#cfc;"
| 82
| April 15
| @ L.A. Lakers
| 
| Ben McLemore (24)
| Carl Landry (9)
| McLemore & Stockton (7)
| Staples Center18,997
| 29–53

Player statistics

Roster

Transactions

Trades

Free agents

Re-signed

Additions

Subtractions

Awards

References

External links
 2014–15 Sacramento Kings preseason at ESPN
 2014–15 Sacramento Kings regular season at ESPN

Sacramento Kings seasons
Sacramento Kings
Sacramento
Sacramento